Baisha is a town of Jishui County, Jiangxi, China. , it has one residential community and 14 villages under its administration.

References

Township-level divisions of Jiangxi
Jishui County